Rubén Ramírez Hidalgo and Santiago Ventura were the defending champions, but they chose to compete in the 2010 Città di Caltanissetta instead.
Ilija Bozoljac and Horia Tecău won in the final 6–1, 6–1, against James Cerretani and Adil Shamasdin.

Seeds

Draw

Draw

References

External links
 Doubles Draw

Morocco Tennis Tour - Marrakech - Doubles
Morocco Tennis Tour – Marrakech
2010 Morocco Tennis Tour